The Holy Days and Fasting Days Act 1551 (5 & 6 Edw 6 c 3) was an Act of the Parliament of England.

It is commonly stated that this act is still in force and attention is drawn to a portion of the act that states citizens must walk to a Christian church on Christmas Day.  In fact, what had not been repealed of this act in previous legislation was repealed as part of the Statute Law (Repeals) Act 1969, under section 1 of, and Part II of the Schedule to, the 1969 act.

Section 2
This section, from "it is also" to first "aforesaide" was repealed by section 1(1) of, and Part I of the Schedule to, the Statute Law Revision Act 1888.

Section 3
This section, from "it is enacted" to "abovesaide" was repealed by section 1(1) of, and Part I of the Schedule to, the Statute Law Revision Act 1888.

Section 5
This section, from "and it is" to first "aforesaide" was repealed by section 1(1) of, and Part I of the Schedule to, the Statute Law Revision Act 1888.

Section 6
This section, from "and it is" to first "aforesaide" was repealed by section 1(1) of, and Part I of the Schedule to, the Statute Law Revision Act 1888.

Section 7
This section, from "and be it" to "aforesaide" was repealed by section 1(1) of, and Part I of the Schedule to, the Statute Law Revision Act 1888.

References
Halsbury's Statutes

Acts of the Parliament of England (1485–1603)
1551 in law
1551 in England